Sarah Jane or Sarah-Jane is the name of:

People

Models 

 Sarah-Jane Dias (born 1982), Indian actress and 2007 Femina Miss India winner
 Sarah-Jane Hutt (born 1964), English model and 1983 Miss World pageant winner

Film and television 

 Sarah Jane Buckley (born 1968), English actress starred in Hollyoaks
 Sarah-Jane Crawford, English television and radio presenter and actress
 Sarah Jane Morris (actress) (born 1977), American actress starred in Felicity and Brothers & Sisters
 Sarah-Jane Honeywell (born 1974), English presenter for the CBeebies television channel
 Sarah-Jane Mee (born 1979), British sports presenter Sky News
 Sarah-Jane Potts (born 1976), British actress starred in Sugar Rush
 Sarah-Jane Redmond (fl. 2000s), British-Canadian actress
 Jane Wyman (born Sarah Jane Mayfield, 1917–2007), American award-winning actress and first wife of Ronald Reagan

Music 

 Sarah Jane Cion, American jazz musician and pianist
 Sarah-Jane Lewis (born 1987), British soprano
 Sarah Jane (keyboardist), American keyboardist and vocalist with Portland, OR band The Upsidedown
 Sarah Jane Morris (singer) (born 1959), jazz, rock, and R&B singer-songwriter
 Sarah Jezebel Deva (Sarah Jane Ferridge, born 1977), backing vocalist in Cradle of Filth, who has her own band, Angtoria
 Sarah-Jane (singer) (born 1985), Swiss demotic singer with Indian roots

Other 
 Sarah Jane Brown, (born 1963), British campaigner and wife of Prime Minister Gordon Brown
 Sarah-Jane Dawson, Australian clinician-scientist
 Sara Jane Moore (born 1930), attempted assassin of President Gerald Ford
 Sarah Jane Woodson Early (1825–1907), American author, educator, and temperance activist
 Sarajane Hoare, British-born magazine editor, fashion journalist and stylist.

Characters 

 Sarah Jane Smith, a character in the television series Doctor Who and The Sarah Jane Adventures spin-off
 Sarah-Jane Fletcher, a character in the soap opera EastEnders